The Under Secretary of Defense for Research and Engineering, abbreviated USD (R&E), is a senior official of the United States Department of Defense. The USD (R&E) is charged with the development and oversight of technology strategy for the DoD. The post (or effectively the same post) has at various times had the titles Assistant Secretary of Defense for Research and Engineering (ASD(R&E)), or Director of Defense Research and Engineering (DDR&E).  The latter title has itself historically varied between the rank of under secretary and that of assistant secretary.

USD (R&E) is the principal staff advisor for research and engineering matters to the Secretary and Deputy Secretary of Defense. In this capacity, USD (R&E) serves as the Chief Technology Officer (CTO) for the Department of Defense charged with the development and oversight of DoD technology strategy in concert with the department's current and future requirements. The goal of USD (R&E) is to extend the capabilities of current war fighting systems, develop breakthrough capabilities, hedge against an uncertain future through a set of scientific and engineering options, and counter strategic surprise. USD (R&E) also provides advice and assistance in developing policies for rapid technology transition.

From 1987 until 1 February 2018, ASD(R&E) was subordinate to the Under Secretary of Defense for Acquisition, Technology and Logistics. On 1 February 2018, the research and engineering were split into an independent office, with the head position being elevated from an assistant secretary to an under secretary level. The remaining acquisition office became the Office of the Under Secretary of Defense for Acquisition and Sustainment (A&S).

Organization 
Organizations included under the USD (R&E) include the following. As of February 2018, organizational relationships remained to be finalized as the organization was being formed. The organizational structure was finalized in July 2018. Agencies marked with an asterisk (*) are not part of the Office of the Secretary of Defense.

 Deputy Under Secretary of Defense for Research and Engineering
Technical Director of Defense Research and Engineering for AI
Technical Director of Defense Research and Engineering for 5G
 Director of Defense Research and Engineering for Research and Technology
 Deputy Director for Strategic Technology Protection and Exploitation
Defense Microelectronics Activity*
 Deputy Director for Research, Technology, and Laboratories
Defense Technical Information Center*
 Director of Defense Research and Engineering for Advanced Capabilities
 Deputy Director for Mission Engineering and Integration
 Deputy Director for Developmental Test and Evaluation
Test Resource Management Center*
Director of Defense Research and Engineering for Modernization
Assistant Director of Defense Research and Engineering for Biotechnology
Assistant Director of Defense Research and Engineering for Autonomy
Assistant Director of Defense Research and Engineering for Cyber
Assistant Director of Defense Research and Engineering for Directed Energy
Assistant Director of Defense Research and Engineering for FNC3
Assistant Director of Defense Research and Engineering for Hypersonics
Assistant Director of Defense Research and Engineering for Microelectronics
Assistant Director of Defense Research and Engineering for Quantum Science
Assistant Director of Defense Research and Engineering for Space
Director of Space Development Agency
Strategic Intelligence Analysis Cell
Strategic Capabilities Office Under the National Defense Authorization Act of 2020, the Strategic Capabilities Office was moved from a subordinate unit under USD(R&E) to a direct report to the Deputy Secretary of Defense.
Defense Innovation Unit
 Missile Defense Agency*
 DARPA*

Upon the February 2018 reorganization, the USD (R&E) assumed responsibility for administering the Small Business Innovation Research and Rapid Innovation Fund programs.

History

The National Security Act of 1947 and its 1949 amendments established the Department of Defense, including the establishment of two statutory boards: a Munitions Board, and a Research and Development Board. In June 1953, President Eisenhower's Reorganization Plan No. 6 abolished the boards as such, and created six new Assistant Secretaries of Defense. Two of these assistant secretary positions—Applications Engineering, and Research and Development—were combined in March 1957 to become the Assistant Secretary of Defense for Research and Engineering (ASD(R&E)).

Under the DoD Reorganization Act of 1958 (PL 85-599, effective 6 August 1958), the position of ASD (R&E) was abolished and replaced by a Director of Defense Research and Engineering (DDR&E).

From 19 May 1961, until 15 July 1965, a Deputy Director of Defense Research and Engineering held the additional title of ASD(R&E), on the theory that this position reported to, in rank, an under secretary—the DDR&E. On 21 October 1977, PL 95-140 made the rank of the DDR&E unambiguous by renaming it to the Under Secretary of Defense for Research and Engineering (USD (R&E)).

The history of Department of Defense management of science and technology up to the 1980s is described at greater length in a report available from the Defense Technical Information Center (DTIC).

The Military Retirement Reform Act of 1986 expanded the scope of USD (R&E) position to encompass acquisition and logistics, as well as technology, and it was renamed USD(AT&L). A subordinate position at the assistant secretary level was reestablished with the previous title DDR&E. However, budget control of the technology portfolio was kept by USD(AT&L), diminishing the importance of the DDR&E position subsequently.

On 7 January 2011, President Obama signed the National Defense Authorization Act with several redesignated titles within the Department of Defense. These changes included renaming the DDR&E as, once again, ASD(R&E).

On 1 February 2018, the Office of the Under Secretary of Defense for Acquisition, Technology and Logistics was split into two new offices: the Office of the Under Secretary of Defense for Research and Engineering (R&E) and the Office of the Undersecretary of Defense for Acquisition and Sustainment (A&S), as a result of the National Defense Authorization Act for Fiscal Year 2017.

Office holders

The table below includes both the various names which this position has been named over time, as well as all the holders of those various offices.  Acting officers have a beige background.

References

External links